Scutiger ningshanensis is a species of toad in the family Megophryidae known commonly as the Ningshan lazy toad and Ningshan alpine toad. It is endemic to Ningshan County in Shaanxi, China. It is a poorly known species; only two specimens have been collected, both from one location. The species has been recorded in grassy habitat near forest streams at up to 2550 meters in elevation. It may face threats from small-scale farming in the area.

References

ningshanensis
Amphibians of China
Endemic fauna of China
Amphibians described in 1985
Taxonomy articles created by Polbot